This is a list of airports in the British Virgin Islands, sorted by location.



Airports 

Airport names shown in bold indicate the airport has scheduled service on commercial airlines.

See also 

 Transport in the British Virgin Islands
 List of airports by ICAO code: T#TU - British Virgin Islands
 List of airports in the United Kingdom and the British Crown Dependencies
 Wikipedia:WikiProject Aviation/Airline destination lists: North America#British Virgin Islands (United Kingdom)

References 

Airports in the British Virgin Islands at Great Circle Mapper

 
Airports
Virgin Islands
British Virgin Islands